Adam Henry (born April 27, 1972) is an American football coach and former player who is the wide receivers coach for the Buffalo Bills of the National Football League (NFL). Henry has previously served as wide receivers coach for the Indiana Hoosiers, LSU, San Francisco 49ers, Cleveland Browns, and New York Giants. He also served as tight ends coach for the Oakland Raiders.

College career
Henry was a wide receiver at McNeese State from 1990 to 1993, earning All-Southland Conference honors as a senior. He finished his career with 93 receptions for 1,690 yards and 16 touchdowns, all of which remain in the top-10 in school history. He was enshrined in the McNeese Sports Hall of Fame in 2017.

Professional career
Following his career at McNeese State, Henry signed a free agent contract with the New Orleans Saints in 1994. He spent training camp and the preseason with the Saints in 1995 and 1996.

Coaching career

McNeese State
Henry joined McNeese State in 1997 as the wide receivers coach. He served as wide receivers coach for nine seasons before being promoted to assistant head coach and offensive coordinator in 2006. As the wide receivers coach, Henry helped develop Jermaine Martin, who finished his career as the school's all-time leader in receptions (160) and receiving yards (2,646), as well as the 2003 Southland Conference Player of the Year, B.J. Sams.

Oakland Raiders
Henry would join the Oakland Raiders in 2007. He spent his first two years with the Raiders as an offensive quality control assistant. Henry was promoted to tight ends coach by head coach Tom Cable in 2009. Henry helped accelerate the development of Zach Miller, who became the first tight end in franchise history to lead the team in receiving for three straight years. Miller set career highs in receptions (66) and receiving yards (805) in 2009, and was selected to the Pro Bowl for the first time the following season, in 2010. In 2011, Henry was retained by new head coach Hue Jackson. However, he was not retained following Jackson's dismissal as head coach.

LSU
Henry would join the LSU Tigers football team in 2012. In his first year with the Tigers, Henry's receiving unit featured four underclassmen and was led by sophomores Odell Beckham Jr. and Jarvis Landry, who combined for 99 receptions for 1,286 yards and seven touchdowns. In 2013, Beckham and Landry became the first pair of receivers in school history to finish with more than 1,000 yards in the same season. Landry led the Tigers with 77 receptions for 1,193 yards and 10 touchdowns, while Beckham caught 59 passes for 1,152 yards and eight touchdowns. Beckham earned first-team All-America honors as a kick returner and an all-purpose player in 2013, and was the recipient of the 2013 Hornung Award as college football's most versatile player. In 2014, redshirt sophomore Travin Dural finished the season ranked sixth in the SEC in receiving yards (758) and tied for seventh in receiving touchdowns (seven). Dural's 20.5 yards per reception average was best in the conference among players with at least 35 catches.

San Francisco 49ers
Henry joined the San Francisco 49ers as the wide receivers coach in 2015.

New York Giants
Henry joined the New York Giants as the wide receivers coach in 2016.

Cleveland Browns
Henry signed a 3-year deal with the Cleveland Browns as their new wide receivers coach in 2018, reuniting him with Jarvis Landry and Odell Beckham Jr.

Dallas Cowboys
Henry left the Browns to join the Dallas Cowboys as their new wide receivers coach. The move came soon after the Cowboys hired former Green Bay Packers head coach, Mike McCarthy. 

Buffalo Bills

Henry left Indiana to be the Buffalo Bills wide receivers coach, taking over for Chad Hall, who left for the same position with the Jacksonville Jaguars.

Personal life
Henry is a native of Beaumont, Texas, He has three children, Darian, Kynidee, and Ava.  Henry is a member of Epsilon Phi chapter of Kappa Alpha Psi. Henry is married to Dr. Zita Henry (Fayetteville, NC).

References

External links
 LSU Tigers bio
 New York Giants bio

1972 births
Living people
American football wide receivers 
Dallas Cowboys coaches
LSU Tigers football coaches
McNeese Cowboys football coaches
McNeese Cowboys football players
New Orleans Saints players
New York Giants coaches
Oakland Raiders coaches
People from Beaumont, Texas
San Francisco 49ers coaches
Coaches of American football from Texas
Players of American football from Texas